Andrés Zúñiga, is a Mexican television actor and singer, known for Nora, Señora Acero and Bajo el mismo cielo. He has appeared in several plays and in almost two dozen television commercials.

Filmography

References

External links 
 

Living people
21st-century Mexican male actors
Mexican male telenovela actors
Mexican male singers
Place of birth missing (living people)
Year of birth missing (living people)